This list of United States Navy SEALs includes both current and former notable members of the Naval Special Warfare teams, known as "SEALs" for "SEa", "Air" and "Land", the full spectrum of environments in which they operate.

List 

 Matthew AxelsonMember of SEAL Delivery Team One, killed in action during Operation Red Wings. Recipient of the Navy Cross.
 Harry BealUnderwater demolition team member, he was the first to volunteer for the SEAL program at its founding in 1962.
 Chris BeckDEVGRU member. After retiring Beck came out as a transgender woman in 2013, changed his name to Kristin and co-authored the memoir Warrior Princess. In 2022, he detransitioned and denounced gender "reassignment" and the feeding of harmful hormones to mentally ill adults and children.
 Matt BissonnetteOperator in Operation Neptune Spear and author of No Easy Day.
 Roy BoehmWWII Pacific War veteran. First commanding officer of SEAL Team Two (1962), considered godfather of all SEALs.
 Rudy BoeschFounding member of SEAL Team Two in 1962 and Vietnam War veteran. He was a competitor in the TV reality shows Survivor and Survivor: All-Stars, and host of the reality series Combat Missions. Former "Bullfrog" or longest-serving active-duty SEAL member.
 Frank M. BradleyRear admiral and Commander of Special Operations Command Central.
 Thomas L. Brown IIRetired Rear admiral and commander of Special Operations Command South and Naval Special Warfare Group One.
 Phil H. BucklewFirst commanding officer, Naval Operations Support Group One (later renamed Naval Special Warfare Group One), twice awarded the Navy Cross and considered the "Father of Modern SPECWAR."
 Edward C. Byers Jr.Medal of Honor recipient; as an assault team member attached to a Joint Task Force in support of Operation Enduring Freedom on 8 December 2012 when he rescued an American hostage (Dr. Dilip Joseph) in the Qarghah’i District of Laghman Province, Afghanistan.
 James F. CahillFirst person to scuba dive in New England waters, founder of first retail scuba diving chain, one of the first UDT members.
 Albert CallandRetired vice admiral, commanding officer of SEAL Team One (1992–1995); Naval Special Warfare Development Group (1997–1999); Naval Special Warfare Command (2002–2004) and Deputy Director of the Central Intelligence Agency. Graduate of the United States Naval Academy.
 Christopher CassidyNASA Astronaut, SEAL platoon commander at SEAL Team Two and SEAL Delivery Vehicle Team Two. Graduate of the United States Naval Academy.
 Dennis ChalkerRetired Master Chief and founding member of SEAL Team Six and Red Cell.
 Dick CouchAuthor of several books on SEALs including The Warrior Elite: Forging of SEAL Class 228, The Finishing School, and Down Range: Navy SEALs in the War on Terrorism. Graduate of the United States Naval Academy.
 Cade CourtleyActor, contestant on the reality series Combat Missions, and host of Spike's Surviving Disaster.
 Eli Crane Member of the House of Representatives for Arizona's 2nd congressional district.
 Dan CrenshawMember of SEAL Team Three and member of the House of Representatives for Texas's 2nd congressional district.
 Keith DavidsRear admiral, former commanding officer of SEAL Team One and Naval Special Warfare Center.
 Rorke DenverSEAL Team Three. Former BUD/S first phase instructor. Starred in the film Act of Valor.
 Danny DietzMember of SEAL Delivery Team One, killed in action during Operation Red Wings in Kunar Province, Afghanistan. Recipient of the Navy Cross.
 Mark L. DonaldNavy Cross recipient during Operation Enduring Freedom.
 Eddie GallagherChief Petty Officer. Notable for a controversial war crime case in which he was acquitted. 
 David GogginsOnly member in the US Armed Forces to complete SEAL training, Ranger School and Air Force Tactical Air Controller training. Also an ultra-marathon runner, motivational speaker, and world record holder.
 William GoinesFounding member of SEAL Team Two in 1962 and retired Master chief petty officer. Vietnam War veteran and Bronze Star metal recipient.
 Eric GreitensGovernor of Missouri, Founder and Chairman of The Mission Continues, Rhodes Scholar.
 Robert HarwardVice admiral and former commanding officer of SEAL Team Three and Naval Special Warfare Group One. Former DEVGRU assault team leader and graduate of the United States Naval Academy.
 Scott HelvenstonYoungest SEAL in history to complete BUD/S; worked as private military contractor in Operation Iraqi Freedom. He was killed during an ambush in Fallujah, Iraq in March 2004.
 Carl HigbieLed the raid capturing the Butcher of Fallujah. Author of Enemies, Foreign & Domestic: A SEAL's Story and Battle on the Home Front.
 Frank HoaglandOhio State Senate, Senator representing 30th District. Served with SEAL Team Four and DEVGRU.
 Hugh W. HowardRear admiral and former commander of Naval Special Warfare Development Group.
 P. Gardner Howe, IIIRetired rear admiral and former commander of Special Operations Command Pacific and Naval Special Warfare Group Three.
 Harry HumphriesSilver Star recipient, Vietnam War veteran, Hollywood actor and technical advisor for films.
 Draper L. KauffmanConsidered the "Father of Naval Combat Demolition". Served during World War II and retired as a rear admiral.
 Joseph D. KernanRetired vice admiral and former commanding officer, SEAL Team Two, Naval Special Warfare Development Group, and Naval Special Warfare Command. Graduate of the United States Naval Academy.
 Bob KerreyMedal of Honor recipient, Vietnam War veteran, Democratic United States Senator from Nebraska, 1989–2001, and president of The New School, 2001–2010.
 Colin J. KilrainVice admiral and former commanding officer, SEAL Team Four and Naval Special Warfare Group Two.
 Jonny KimGraduate of Harvard Medical School (M.D.); NASA astronaut; Silver Star and Bronze Star with Combat "V" device.
 Erik S. KristensenGraduate of the United States Naval Academy, killed during rescue mission as part of Operation Red Wings.
 Alexander KrongardRetired Rear Admiral and former commanding officer, SEAL Team Seven, Naval Special Warfare Group One.
 Chris Kyle Iraq War veteran and sniper with SEAL Team Three. With a record 160 confirmed kills (of a claimed 255), he was labelled the "Most lethal sniper in US military history".
 Kevin LaczFormer SEAL Team Three sniper, New York Times bestselling author of "The Last Punisher", and actor and technical advisor in the Oscar-winning Chris Kyle biopic American Sniper.
 Frank J. LarkinSergeant at Arms of the United States Senate and retired United States Secret Service agent
 Kaj LarsenFormer SEAL lieutenant and journalist with CNN, CurrentTV, and Current TV's Emmy-winning investigative journalism series Vanguard.
 Marc Alan LeeFirst SEAL killed in combat during Operation Iraqi Freedom. Awarded the Silver Star, Bronze Star with Valor and the Purple Heart.
 Brian L. LoseyRear admiral and former commander of the Naval Special Warfare Command, Combined Joint Task Force – Horn of Africa, and Naval Special Warfare Development Group.
 Michael D. LumpkinServed as Assistant Secretary of Defense for Special Operations/Low Intensity Conflict 2013–2016. Acting Under Secretary of Defense for Policy, Special Envoy US Department of State in 2017. Selected as Commissioner on Afghanistan War Commission in April 2022.
 Marcus LuttrellNavy Cross recipient for heroism, sole survivor of Operation Red Wings. Twin brother of Morgan Luttrell.
 Morgan Luttrell Member of the House of Representatives for Texas's 8th congressional district. Former SEAL officer with 14 years of service. Twin brother of Marcus Luttrell.
 Richard "Dick" LyonRear admiral and first Bullfrog (longest-serving active duty member of the US Navy SEALs) and first UDT-SEAL to achieve flag rank.
 Richard "Mac" MachowiczFormer SEAL and founder of Bukido training system. Host of Discovery Channel's Futureweapons and co-host on Spike' TVs Deadliest Warrior.
 Joseph MaguireFormer commanding officer of SEAL Team Two and commanding officer at Naval Special Warfare Center.
 Richard MarcinkoServed two combat tours in the Vietnam War before serving as commanding officer of SEAL Team Two (1974–1976). First commanding officer of SEAL Team Six from October 1980 to July 1983 and Red Cell from 1984 to 1986; co-author of New York Times bestseller Rogue Warrior.
 Donald L. McFaulKilled in action during Operation Just Cause and posthumously awarded the Navy Cross for heroism.
 William H. McRavenRetired admiral and former commanding officer of SEAL Team Three, Joint Special Operations Command and US Special Operations Command.
 Michael A. MonsoorPosthumous Medal of Honor recipient for jumping on an enemy hand grenade during a firefight in Iraq to save fellow SEALs.
 Scott P. MooreRetired Rear admiral and former commanding officer of SEAL Team Two and Naval Special Warfare Development Group from 2007 to 2009. Graduate of the United States Air Force Academy.
 Faauuga MuagututiaA competitor for American Samoa at the 1994 Winter Olympics in the bobsleigh.
 Michael P. MurphyMedal of Honor recipient, exposed himself to fire while calling in support during Operation Red Wings in Afghanistan.
 Thomas R. NorrisVietnam War veteran, Medal of Honor recipient and retired FBI agent. Founding member of FBI Hostage Rescue Team in 1983.
 Eric T. OlsonVeteran of The First Battle of Mogadishu, Silver Star recipient, commanding officer of Naval Special Warfare Development Group from 1994 to 1997. Former commander, Naval Special Warfare Command. First SEAL to achieve the rank of vice admiral and admiral; the first Navy officer to command US Special Operations Command. Graduate of the United States Naval Academy.
 Robert J. O'NeillReportedly fired the fatal shots into Osama bin Laden during Operation Neptune Spear in 2011 with DEVGRU. Also participated in the rescue of Captain Richard Phillips during the Maersk Alabama hijacking as well as the rescue of Marcus Luttrell during Operation Red Wings. Later a motivational speaker and author of The Operator.
 William OwensKilled in action during the Yakla raid in Yemen.
 William PayneNew Mexico state senator, deputy commander of SEAL Team One and deputy director of operations, Center for Special Operations, US Special Operations Command.
 Chuck PfarrerFormer SEAL Team Four and DEVGRU operator from 1984 to 1986; screenwriter with credits including The Jackal, Darkman, Red Planet, Virus, Hard Target, Navy SEALs; author of the New York Times bestseller SEAL Target Geronimo: Inside The Mission to Kill Osama Bin Laden, Warrior Soul: The Memoir of a Navy SEAL and the reality-thriller Killing Che.
 Erik PrinceFounder, former CEO, and current chairman of private military contractor Academi, (formerly known as Blackwater).
 Sean A. PybusRetired vice admiral and commanding officer of Naval Special Warfare Command from 2011 to 2013. Served as commander, Special Operations Command Pacific from 2009 to 2011.
 Jason RedmanFounder and spokesperson of the nonprofit organization Wounded Wear and the author of the memoir The Trident: The Forging and Reforging of a Navy SEAL Officer.
 Thomas R. Richards Vietnam War veteran and Rear admiral. Former commander, Naval Special Warfare Command.
Mike Ritland Public speaker, podcaster, and working/protection dog trainer. Created the Warrior Dog Foundation  which, "transitions our country’s working K9s from an operational environment into retirement."
 Theodore Roosevelt IVVietnam-era UDT and great-grandson of President Theodore Roosevelt.
 Craig "Sawman" SawyerServed in the United States Marine Corps, then transitioned to the Navy to pursue special operations career as a SEAL. He served with SEAL Team One and as a sniper with DEVGRU.
 William M. ShepherdFirst SEAL in space, first American commander of the International Space Station.
 Don ShipleyServed in SEAL Teams One and Two. Former BUD/S and NSW Demolitions instructor.
 Britt K. SlabinskiMedal of Honor recipient for actions in Afghanistan (upgraded from Navy Cross in 2018). Former member of DEVGRU from 1994 to 2008 and former command master chief of Naval Special Warfare Group Two. Navy Cross recipient for heroism during Operation Anaconda in 2002.
 Neil SmitRetired Lieutenant Commander at DEVGRU. Former CEO of Comcast.
 Raymond SmithRetired rear admiral and former deputy commander of United States Special Operations Command. Former commanding officer of SEAL Delivery Team One and director of Basic Underwater Demolition/SEAL (BUD/S) training from 1981 to 1983. Graduate of the United States Naval Academy. Graduated BUD/S in 1970 and served as a platoon commander during Vietnam War.
 Tim SzymanskiRetired vice admiral and former commanding officer of SEAL Team Two and Naval Special Warfare Group Two. Former troop, squadron commander, operations officer and deputy commanding officer of DEVGRU. Graduate of the United States Naval Academy. Former Commanding Officer, Naval Special Warfare Command (2016–2018).
 Scott Taylor Member of the House of Representatives for Virginia's 2nd congressional district.
 Michael E. ThorntonMedal of Honor recipient from the Vietnam War, founding member of DEVGRU.
 Mike TroyTwo-time Olympic gold medalist and former world record-holder. Received Silver Star during the Vietnam War.
 Derrick Van Orden Member of the House of Representatives for Wisconsin's 3rd congressional district.
 Peter VaselyRear admiral, served as assistant to the Director of the Navy Staff
 Jesse VenturaOriginal name is Jim Janos. Former pro wrestler, governor of Minnesota.
 Howard E. WasdinAuthor of SEAL Team Six: Memoirs of an Elite Navy Sniper and former member of DEVGRU. Veteran of The First Battle of Mogadishu in Somalia, 1993.
 Brandon WebbSEAL sniper instructor and author.
 Jocko WillinkReceived the Silver Star and Bronze Star for his actions in the Iraq War. Willink was commander of SEAL Team Three's Task Unit Bruiser during the 2006 Battle of Ramadi. Author of the book Extreme Ownership along with fellow SEAL Leif Babin. Hosts a weekly podcast, The Jocko Podcast, with friend and fellow Brazilian jiu-jitsu practitioner, Echo Charles. Founded the leadership consulting company, Echelon Front, with Babin.
 Edward G. Winters, IIIRetired rear admiral and former commanding officer of the Naval Special Warfare Development Group (2003–2005) and Naval Special Warfare Command (2008–2011).
 Brandon WolffFormer American mixed martial artist. His twin brother, Brenton, is also a SEAL and a former mixed martial artist.
 Ryan ZinkeRetired Navy commander and former member of DEVGRU; member of the House of Representatives for Montana's at-large congressional district and Montana's 2nd congressional district; Secretary of the Interior 2017-2019.

See also

References 

US Navy SEALs list
Navy SEALs